Rajat Neogy (December 17, 1939 – December 3, 1995), a Ugandan of Indian Bengali ancestry, was a writer, poet and publisher. In Kampala in 1961, at the age of 22, he founded Transition Magazine, which went on to become widely influential throughout Africa. In the words of Ngugi wa Thiong'o, "he (Neogy) believed in the multi-cultural and multifaceted character of ideas, and he wanted to provide a space where different ideas could meet, clash, and mutually illuminate. Transition became the intellectual forum of the New East Africa, and indeed Africa, the first publisher of some of the leading intellectuals in the continent, including Wole Soyinka, Ali Mazrui and Peter Nazareth."

Biography
Neogy was born and grew up in Kampala, Uganda. He studied at university in London and after returning to Uganda in 1961 founded Transition, which soon came to be considered the leading journal of free expression in Africa. In 1968, after criticizing the Ugandan government in the magazine, was charged with sedition and spent months in detention before being acquitted and released. Leaving Uganda, he moved in 1970 to Ghana, where he resumed publishing Transition, with Wole Soyinka taking over as editor. Neogy then settled in the United States.

Neogy died aged 57 at his home in San Francisco, where he had lived for two decades.

References

External links
Paul Theroux, "Rajat Neogy Remembered" Transition, No. 69 (1996), pp. 4–7.
 Paul Theroux, "Obituary: Rajat Neogy", The Independent, 15 January 1996.

1939 births
1995 deaths
Ugandan male poets
Ugandan people of Indian descent
Ugandan people of Bengali descent
20th-century Ugandan poets
20th-century male writers